The 54th Battalion (Kootenay), CEF, was an infantry battalion of the Canadian Expeditionary Force during the Great War.

History 
The 54th Battalion was authorized on 7 November 1914, embarked for Britain on 22 November 1915 and disembarked in France on 14 August 1916. It fought as part of the 11th Infantry Brigade, 4th Canadian Division in France and Flanders until the end of the war. The battalion was disbanded on 30 August 1920.

The 54th Battalion recruited in Southern British Columbia and was mobilized at Nelson, B.C.

The 54th Battalion had three Officers Commanding:
Lt-Col A.G.H. Kemball, CB, DSO 22 November 1915 – 1 March 1917
Lt.-Col. V.V. Harvey, DSO, 2 March 1917 – 24 August 1917
Lt.-Col. A.B. Carey, CMG, DSO, 24 August 1917-Demobilization

Battle Honours 
The 54th Battalion was awarded the following battle honours:
SOMME, 1916
Ancre Heights
Ancre, 1916
ARRAS, 1917, '18
Vimy, 1917
HILL 70
Ypres 1917
Passchendaele
AMIENS
Scarpe, 1918
Drocourt-Quéant
HINDENBURG LINE
Canal du Nord
VALENCIENNES
SAMBRE
FRANCE AND FLANDERS, 1916-18

Perpetuation 
The 54th Battalion (Kootenay), CEF, is perpetuated by The 24th Field Artillery Regiment, RCA, currently on the Supplementary Order of Battle.

Notable people
Harry Letson, Canadian Army Adjutant General in World War II

See also 

 List of infantry battalions in the Canadian Expeditionary Force

References

Sources

Canadian Expeditionary Force 1914-1919 by Col. G.W.L. Nicholson, CD, Queen's Printer, Ottawa, Ontario, 1962

054
Military units and formations of British Columbia